PFC. Navbahor Namangan is an Uzbek professional football club based in Namangan. The club's name means New Spring. They play in Uzbekistan Super League.

Name
Navbahor origins from Persian word Now-Bahaar (New-Spring).

History
Navbahor Namangan was founded 1978 under the name Tekstilshchik and played in first league of Uzbekistan. Since 1978 club participated in one of regional zones of Soviet Second League. In 1990 season Navbahor finished runner-up in Soviet Second League, East conference and promoted to Soviet First League. 1991 Soviet First League season Navbahor Namangan finished at 9th place.

Since 1992 Navbahor plays in Uzbek League. The club is one of three clubs among Pakhtakor, Neftchi Farg'ona continuously participating in all seasons of Uzbek League. In 1996 Navbahor Namangan became champion of Uzbekistan, finishing league from 1993 to 1995 three times in a row at 3rd position. Navbahor is also winner of the Uzbekistan Supercup in 1999, a match between champion and Uzbek Cup winner.

2004 season Navbahor finished 3rd, the recent best achievement of club. The club was unsuccessful in 2008–13 years. In 2009 season club ranked 14th in the League, close to relegation to First League and it is actually the lowest ranking of the club in its history.

In January 2014 Bakhtiyor Ashurmatov was appointed as new head coach of the club.

Name change history
 1978–80: Tekstilshchik
 1980–83: Navbahor
 1983–87: Avtomobilist
 1988–: PFC. Navbahor

Domestic

Continental history

Stadium
Clubs home ground is Markaziy Stadium with original capacity of 35,000. The stadium which was built in 1989 was one of the biggest football stadiums by capacity in the country. In 2011, the club have announced their intention to renovate the stadium and it was closed for long time reconstruction. The rehabilitation works were finished in spring 2014. The festive opening of the renovated all-seater stadium was held on 29 May 2014 with Barkamol avlod 2014 annual sporting games opening ceremony. The capacity of the new venue is 22,000.

In 2012–14 seasons club played home matches in Kosonsoy Stadium. The first official match in renovated stadium was held on 14 June 2014 with League match Navbahor – Olmaliq FK with 3–1 victory of host team.

Current squad

Honours

Domestic
Uzbek League: 1  
 Winner: 1996
 2nd place: 2022
 3rd place: 1993, 1994, 1995, 1997, 1998, 1999, 2003, 2004
Uzbek Cup: 3
 1992, 1995, 1998
Uzbekistan Super Cup: 1
 1999

International
Asian Cup Winners Cup:
1999–00: 4th place

Managerial history

References

External links
  of the club
  of the Fans
 
 Navbahor Namangan at Soccerway

Football clubs in Uzbekistan
Sport in Namangan
Association football clubs established in 1978
1978 establishments in Uzbekistan